Langvlei (Afrikaans for long marsh) may refer to:

 Langvlei, a neighbourhood in Paarl
 Bo-Langvlei, a lake in the Wilderness National Park